The Cleveland Arms Apartment Building is a historic residential building at 2410 Central Avenue in Hot Springs, Arkansas.  It is an L-shaped three-story building, finished in brick veneer.  Its entrances are framed by a simplified Art Deco surround, and the Oakwood Street facade is adorned with the words "Cleveland Arms" in Art Deco lettering.  It was built about 1945 through the effort of Thomas Cleveland, owner of a local insurance company, and was built using funding support from the Federal Housing Administration as housing for returning war veterans.  It was designed by I.D. McDaniel, a local architect.

The building was listed on the National Register of Historic Places in 2018.

See also
National Register of Historic Places listings in Garland County, Arkansas

References

Residential buildings completed in 1945
National Register of Historic Places in Hot Springs, Arkansas
Apartment buildings on the National Register of Historic Places in Arkansas
1945 establishments in Arkansas
Art Deco architecture in Arkansas